Phish is an American rock band noted for their live concerts and improvisational jamming. Audience recordings of Phish's live shows have been traded among fans since the band's earliest days. In addition to numerous studio albums and projects, Phish has maintained a steady output of live releases and albums, including the Live Phish series, the Live Bait series, the Live Phish Downloads series, along with numerous box sets and stand-alone archival releases. The band has also officially released every show they've performed since 2002, which are available at LivePhish

Albums

Studio albums
Phish recorded and/or released several albums before being signed to Elektra Records in 1991; they remained with Elektra through 2004, before founding their own label, JEMP Records. Phish's albums all feature the quartet of Trey Anastasio (guitar), Mike Gordon (bass guitar), Jon Fishman (drums), and Page McConnell (keyboards), often joined by a number of guest musicians.

Other albums

Unreleased albums

Live albums

Live Phish series
Beginning in late 2001, the "Live Phish" series are multi-CD sets chronicling complete shows picked by the band spanning their entire career. 
The original twenty-volume "Live Phish" series was released by Elektra Records and launched while Phish was on hiatus from recording and touring (October 2000 to December 2002).  Numbered 01 through 20, each multi-disc set was made available individually and featured innovative packaging: a cardboard slipcase containing the compact discs housed in a foldable plastic page that could be stored in a ShowCase binder that was sold separately or with select copies of Volume 06. The first six volumes were simultaneously released on September 18, 2001. The rest of the series was then released in sporadic batches through May 2003. Among the initial twenty volumes, there are four two-disc sets, twelve three-disc sets and four quadruple-disc sets totaling over forty-seven and a half hours of live recordings ranging from 1989 to 2000.  The original plastic fold-out CD pages eventually began leaking a sticky liquid goo that often ruined the CDs within the covers. Elektra Records thus began re-issuing several Live Phish Volumes 1 through 20 in clamshell CD cases in the mid-2000s.

Live Phish Downloads: Archival releases
A : The Live Phish Downloads Series is regularly updated with shows both old and new, available as downloads in various formats, with select shows* made available on CD

Compilation albums

Live Bait series

Singles

From 1992 to 2004 Phish was signed with Elektra Records and released seventeen CD promo singles for radio DJs and one commercial cassette single, "Down with Disease". In 2005 Phish started their own record label, JEMP Records (in association with Rhino for a year) and have released one promo single and four digital singles since.

Video releases

Phish tributes discography
Since 2000, various artists have recorded a number of tribute albums dedicated to the rock band Phish. Like Phish's music, the albums cover a wide range of genres including reggae, bluegrass, classical music, and more. The first Phish tribute album - Sharin' in the Groove - was a double album created by a non-profit group of fans called The Mockingbird Foundation, who also published The Phish Companion. The album features a number of high-profile musicians performing Phish songs, including Jimmy Buffett, The Wailers, Dave Matthews, Arlo Guthrie, Hot Tuna, Tom Tom Club, and members of Pavement and Los Lobos. The members of Phish officially endorsed this album, which also featured an album release concert at the Great American Music Hall in San Francisco led by Merl Saunders. In 2002, members of the Birmingham, Alabama bluegrass group Rollin' in the Hay collaborated with a number of other bluegrass musicians to release Gone Phishin: A Bluegrass Tribute to Phish, featuring all instrumental versions of Phish classics. The album was a success, and a sequel followed later in the year with a song list that included more obscure Phish songs. In 2004, Phish became one of over a hundred bands to have their songs interpreted by a string quartet (joining the ranks of Tool, Radiohead, and U2). Another bluegrass tribute (this time with vocals) by a group of Nashville-based musicians was released later in the year.

Gone Phishin: A Bluegrass Tribute to Phish (2000)
Sharin' in the Groove: Celebrating the Music of Phish (2001)
Still Phishin: A Bluegrass Tribute to Phish 2 (2002)
JamGrass (Progressive Bluegrass Jams on a Band Called Phish) (2004)
The String Quartet Tribute to Phish (2004)
High Neighbors: Dub Tribute to Phish (2006)
Dub Like An Antelope - Legends of Reggae Celebrate Phish (2009)

Cover songs of other artists
They consistently vary their set lists while touring extensively. To keep the music fresh and the audiences intrigued, Phish records and performs a number of cover songs from various musical genres.

Books

The Phish Book (official biography written by Phish and Richard Gehr – 1998)
Phish: The Biography (non-official biography written by Parke Puterbaugh  – 2009)

Live albums by recording date
This is a list of live Phish albums released on CD or LP in recording date order.

Colorado '88 – July 28 – August 5, 1988
Live Phish 09 – August 26, 1989
Live Phish 19 – July 12, 1991
At the Roxy – February 19 – 21, 1993
St. Louis '93 – April 14 – August 16, 1993
Live Phish 07 – August 14, 1993
Live Phish 18 – May 7, 1994
Chicago '94 – June 18 – November 25, 1994
Live Phish 10 – June 22, 1994
A Live One – July 8 – December 31, 1994
Live Phish 02 – July 16, 1994
Live Phish 13 – October 31, 1994
Live Phish 20 – December 29, 1994
Live Phish 14 – October 31, 1995
Niagara Falls – December 7, 1995
Live Phish 01 – December 14, 1995
New Year's Eve 1995 – December 31, 1995
Live Phish 12 – August 13, 1996
The Clifford Ball – August 16 – 17, 1996
Live Phish 15 – October 31, 1996
Vegas 96 – December 6, 1996
Amsterdam – February 17 – July 2, 1997
Slip Stitch and Pass – March 1, 1997
Ventura – July 30, 1997 – July 20, 1998
Live Phish 11 – November 17, 1997
Hampton/Winston-Salem '97 – November 21 – 23, 1997
Live Phish 04.02.98 – April 2, 1998
Live Phish 04.03.98 – April 3, 1998
Live Phish 04.04.98 – April 4, 1998
Live Phish 04.05.98 – April 5, 1998
Live Phish 17 – July 15, 1998
The Gorge '98 – July 16 – 17, 1998
Live Phish 16 – October 31, 1998
Hampton Comes Alive – November 20 – 21, 1998
Live Phish 06 – November 27, 1998
Live Phish 08 – July 10, 1999
LP on LP 04 – May 22, 2000
Live Phish 04 – June 14, 2000
Live Phish 05 – July 8, 2000
Live Phish 03 – September 14, 2000
Live Phish 02.28.03 – February 28, 2003
Live Phish 07.15.03 – July 15, 2003
Live Phish 07.29.03 – July 29, 2003
Live in Brooklyn – June 17, 2004
LP on LP 02 – May 26, 2011
LP on LP 03 – August 22, 2015
The Complete Baker's Dozen – July 21 – August 6, 2017
The Baker's Dozen: Live at Madison Square Garden – July 21 – August 6, 2017
Kasvot Växt: í rokk – October 31, 2018
LP on LP 01 – July 14, 2019

References

Discography
Discographies of American artists
Rock music group discographies
Funk music discographies